Ten is the eighth album by American pianist and composer Jason Moran, celebrating a decade of his trio The Bandwagon, which was released on the Blue Note label in 2010.

Reception

The AllMusic review by Matt Collar said it "features more of the jazz pianist's smart and forward-thinking jazz" and that "Moran reveals himself once again to be a nimble improviser with an ear toward atmospheric and often fractured hypnotic post-bop jazz".

All About Jazz stated, "The piano trio is a mainstay in the jazz tradition, and here the Bandwagon does a characteristically great job of being firmly in that tradition while also blazing a new trail … A sense of joy is evident in every note the group plays. Let's hope we get another 10 years, and see where they take the Bandwagon next".

In The Guardian, John Fordham called it "a balanced, varied, and very rewarding set" and wrote "This album has no guiding concept beyond his long-acquainted virtuoso trio's powers to listen and play together. It's also about how traditionally bluesy or gospel-rooted themes can be led through a contemporary world of probing, busily improvised bass counterpoint, bumpy street-groove rhythms and the occasional sampled effect".

The PopMatters review by Justin Cober-Lake called it "one of the year’s best releases" and observed "the versatility wouldn’t be remarkable if the trio wasn’t so successful in every venture. Since they are, Ten coheres as a remarkable unit, embracing an array of styles and eras of influence into something uniquely compelling".

Track listing
All compositions by Jason Moran except where noted
 "Blue Blocks" – 4:36
 "RFK in the Land of Apartheid" – 4:10
 "Feedback Pt. 2" – 4:54
 "Crespuscule with Nellie" (Thelonious Monk) – 5:58
 "Study No. 6" (Conlon Nancarrow) – 3:17
 "Pas De Deux - Lines Ballet" – 3:31
 "Study No. 6" (Nancarrow) – 4:04
 "Gangsterism Over 10 Years" – 6:56
 "Big Stuff" (Leonard Bernstein) – 5:17
 "Play to Live" (Andrew Hill, Jason Moran) – 4:21
 "The Subtle One" (Tarus Mateen) – 5:35
 "To Bob Vatel of Paris" (Jaki Byard) – 6:06
 "Old Babies" – 5:56

Personnel 
Musicians
 Jason Moran – piano
 Tarus Mateen – bass
 Nasheet Waits – drums
 Jonas Moran – vocals (track 13)
 Malcolm Moran – vocals (track 13)

Production
 Jason Moran – producer
 Sascha Von Oertzen – mixing engineer
 Jonathan Altschuler – assistant mixing engineer
 Rick Kwan – assistant tracking engineer
 Gene Paul – mastering engineer
 Jamie – mastering engineer
 Eli Wolf – A&R
 Antwon Jackson – A&R administration
 Louise Holland – management
 Vision Arts Management Inc. – management
 Shanieka D. Brooks – product manager
 Burton Yount – art direction, design 
 Gordon H Jee – creative direction
 Adam Pendleton – design (cover)
 Clay Patrick McBride – photography

References

2010 albums
Jason Moran (musician) albums
Blue Note Records albums